Felicity: An American Girl Adventure is the second in the series of American Girl film series. It is a made-for-television drama film that is based on the American Girl children's books written by Valerie Tripp, and was released in November 29, 2005. The teleplay was written by Anna Sandor.

The film revolves around Felicity Merriman's adventures during the onset of the American Revolution.

Plot
Ten-year-old Felicity Merriman is growing up in Williamsburg, Virginia, just before the American Revolution. High-spirited and independent, Felicity decides to tame a wild horse owned by an abusive leather maker/tanner, Jiggy Nye. Even though her parents Martha and Edward forbid her, she runs off to be with the horse, whom she names Penny. She eventually tames Penny and the two become fast friends.

Meanwhile, tension grows between the colonists. Some, including Edward and his apprentice Ben Davidson, wish for independence from King George III of England. Others, like Felicity’s grandfather and her best friend Elizabeth Cole’s family, remain loyal to the king.

Cast
Shailene Woodley    as Felicity Merriman
Marcia Gay Harden   as Martha Merriman
Robinne Fanfair     as Rose
David Gardner      as Grandfather
Eulala Scheel   as     Nan Merriman
Lynne Griffin       as Lady Templeton
Katie Henney        as Elizabeth Cole
Juliet Holland-Rose as Annabelle Cole
Géza Kovács        as Jiggy Nye
John Schneider  as Edward Merriman
Janine Theriault  as Miss Frances Manderly
Kevin Zegers      as Benjamin “Ben” Davidson
Daniel Gariépy and Alexis daSilva Powell as minuet dancers

Reception
The film received mixed reviews, earning an average score of 63 out of 100 on the aggregator site Metacritic.

References

External links

 Felicity: An American Girl Adventure — official home page

2005 television films
2005 films
American Girl films
American Revolutionary War films
American television films
Films about horses
Films based on American novels
Films directed by Nadia Tass
Films set in the 1770s
Films set in Virginia
American children's films
2000s American films